Sarina is a female given name. Notable people with the name include:

Arts and entertainment
Sarina Brewer, American sculptor
Sarina Cassvan (1894–1978), Romanian novelist
Sarina Cross (born 1994), Lebanese-Armenian singer
Sarina Farhadi Iranian actress
Sarina Maskey (born 1987), Nepalese beauty pageant winner
Sarina Paris (born 1973), Canadian singer
Sarina Singh, Australian author
Sarina Suno, Japanese violinist
Sarina Suzuki (born 1977), Japanese actress

Business
Sarina Prabasi (born 1973/74), Nepalese executive
Sarina Russo (born 1951), Australian executive

Sports
Sarina Bolden (born 1996), Filipino footballer 
Sarina Hülsenbeck (born 1962), East German swimmer
Sarina Koga (born 1996), Japanese volleyball player
Sarina Roberti (born 1963), Belgian rhythmic gymnast
Sarina Wiegman (born 1969), Dutch footballer

See also 

Serena (given name)
Sakina (given name)
Sarena Parmar
Serina (actress)
Sirena (disambiguation)
Sirina (disambiguation)

Feminine given names